Cichlocolaptes is a genus of passerine birds in the ovenbird family Furnariidae. They are found in Brazil.

Taxonomy
The genus Cichlocolaptes was introduced in 1853 by the German naturalist Ludwig Reichenbach. The name combines the Ancient Greek kikhlē meaning "thrush" with kolaptēs meaning "chiseller". The type species was designated by George Robert Gray in 1855 as Anabates ferruginolentus Wied. This taxon is a junior synonym of Anabates leucophrus (pale-browed treehunter) described by William Jardine & Prideaux John Selby in 1830.

Species
The genus contains two species:
 Pale-browed treehunter (Cichlocolaptes leucophrus)
 Cryptic treehunter (Cichlocolaptes mazarbarnetti)

References

 
Bird genera
Taxa named by Ludwig Reichenbach
Taxonomy articles created by Polbot